Carrot bread is a quick bread, or yeast-leavened bread, that uses carrots as the primary ingredient. It may be prepared with grated, shredded carrots, or carrot juice. Baking times can vary depending on the amount of juice in the carrots used, and it may be a moist bread. Carrot bread may have an orange color derived from carrot juice or carrots used.

Additional ingredients used in the preparation of carrot bread may include zucchini (although zucchini itself can be made into zucchini bread), buttermilk, eggs, milk, brown sugar, cinnamon, nutmeg, walnuts, ginger and raisins. Carrot bread can be prepared as a sourdough and/or multigrain bread. It may eaten plain, served with butter, or topped with an icing or glaze. Carrot bread can be served as a means to increase vegetable intake in diets.

See also
 Carrot cake
 Carrot cake cookie
 Banana bread

Lists 
 List of breads
 List of carrot dishes
 List of quick breads

References

Further reading
 

Breads
Carrot dishes